Šadeiko is a surname. Notable people with the surname include:

Grete Šadeiko (born 1993), Estonian heptathlete, sister of Grit
Grit Šadeiko (born 1989), Estonian heptathlete